Arthur Hickman (6 August 1910 – 1 February 1995) was a Welsh rugby union, and professional rugby league footballer who played in the 1930s. He played representative level rugby union (RU) for Wales, and at club level for Neath RFC, as a Wing, i.e. number 11 or 14, and club level rugby league (RL) for Swinton.

Background
Arthur Hickman was born in Skewen, Wales.

International honours
Arthur Hickman won caps for Wales (RU) while at Neath RFC in 1930 against England, and in 1933 against Scotland.

References

External links
Search for "Hickman" at rugbyleagueproject.org

Statistics at scrum.com
Statistics at wru.co.uk

1910 births
1995 deaths
Footballers who switched code
Neath RFC players
Rugby league players from Neath Port Talbot
Rugby union players from Skewen
Rugby union wings
Swinton Lions players
Wales international rugby union players
Welsh rugby league players
Welsh rugby union players